Clepsis melissa is a moth of the family Tortricidae. It is found in India, Nepal, China (Sichuan, Yunnan) and Vietnam.

References

Moths described in 1908
Clepsis